Calidonia may refer to:
Calidonia, Panamá, Panama
Calidonia, Veraguas, Panama